Nikola Rokvić (born 29 June 1985) is a Serbian singer and entrepreneur. The oldest son of folk singer Marinko Rokvić, he also became a well-known artist upon the release of his 2006 debut album, titled Oprosti mojoj mladosti. Although known primarily for performing pop-folk music, Rokvić also ventured into pop since the release of Ovaj put in 2015.

Beyond his music career, Rokvić participated on the reality television shows Survivor Srbija VIP: Philippines (2010) and the third season of Tvoje lice zvuči poznato (2016). 

He is also the co-founder and CEO of the first Serbian streaming platform, called YouBox.

During his time in the Philippines, Rokvić developed an on-screen romantic relationship with fellow contestant, Serbian-American model Bojana Barović. The couple eventually married in 2016 and has a son and three daughters.

Discography
Studio albums
Oprosti mojoj mladosti (2006)
Prećuti me (2008)
Ovaj put (2015)

Filmography

See also 
Music of Serbia

References

External links
 
  

1985 births
Living people
Singers from Belgrade
21st-century Serbian male singers
Grand Production artists
Serbian folk-pop singers
Serbian pop singers